David John Mallinson (born 7 July 1946) is an English former professional footballer who played in the Football League for Mansfield Town.

References

1946 births
Living people
English footballers
Association football midfielders
English Football League players
Mansfield Town F.C. players
Leamington F.C. players